Pretenders is the debut studio album by British-American band The Pretenders, released in 1979. A combination of rock and roll, punk and new wave music, this album made the band famous. The album features the singles "Stop Your Sobbing", "Kid" and "Brass in Pocket".

Nick Lowe produced the Pretenders' first single, "Stop Your Sobbing", but decided not to work with them again as he thought the band was "not going anywhere". Chris Thomas took over on the subsequent recording sessions.

Release
Pretenders debuted at number one on the UK Albums Chart in the week of its release and stayed there for four consecutive weeks. It also made the top 10 on the Billboard 200 and was certified platinum during 1982 by the RIAA.

Pretenders was remastered and re-released in 2006 and included a bonus disc of demos, B-sides and live cuts, many previously unreleased. "Cuban Slide" and "Porcelain" originally appeared as B-sides to "Talk of the Town" and "Message of Love", while "Swinging London" and "Nervous But Shy" both appeared on the flip side of "Brass in Pocket". The Regents Park demo of "Stop Your Sobbing" was included initially as a flexi-single in the May 1981 edition of Flexipop magazine. The tracks "Message of Love", "Talk of the Town", "Porcelain" and "Cuban Slide" alongside a live version of the album's opening track, "Precious", were released on a follow-up EP entitled Extended Play soon after.

Pretenders was also reissued in 2009 by Audio Fidelity as a limited-edition audiophile gold CD, using the original master tapes. However, this remaster suffered from unauthorized, heavy limiting supposedly applied after engineer Steve Hoffman's digital master was created and approved for CD manufacturing. The song "The Phone Call" is missing some of the telephone effects on this release because the effects were "flown in" after the master was completed for the song and, as a result, were not on the original master tape. There were no bonus tracks included.

A shortened version of "Tequila" would be performed nearly 15 years later on the Last of the Independents. "Sabre Dance" features Chrissie Hynde singing portions of "Stop Your Sobbing" over lengthy solos by James Honeyman-Scott and Martin Chambers' insistent drumming, making it a truly unique version.

A cover version of "Brass in Pocket" and the master version of "Precious" are available as downloadable content for Rock Band.

Another deluxe edition of the album, curated by Hynde, was released on 5 November 2021 and features the original album remastered by Chris Thomas, alongside demos, rarities, and many live performances. These include BBC sessions on The Kid Jensen Show, and performances at The Paris Theatre in London and Paradise Theater in Boston.

Critical reception
Contemporary reviews for the album were mixed. In Melody Maker, Chris Brazier called the record "the first important album" of the 1980s, and while the second side of the album was better than the first side, overall "the album is irresistible". However, Tony Stewart of NME criticised Melody Maker for hyping the band, and said that "so much about the Pretenders is reminiscent of '60s pop games that any claim they are innovative is completely invalid". Stewart noted influences from the Velvet Underground, the Beatles, the 1960s beat boom, Blondie and the Police, and while he acknowledged Hynde's talents as a frontwoman, he dismissed the band's playing and inability to lift the music to the level of the lyrics, stating that "they seem unable to give it an edge". Soundss Robbi Millar said of the album, "Its success, which should be fairly apparent through the next few months, will be valued not through hype and wildly enthusiastic pen-happy journalists but through a number of strong album tracks." Millar also noted several influences, including Sting and Public Image Ltd, and that the album included three singles and two B-sides that had already been released, but that it also included "seven other worthy tracks" which resulted in "one fine first album".

In 1989, Rolling Stone ranked Pretenders the 20th best album of the 1980s. In 2012, Slant Magazine listed Pretenders at number 64 on its list of the best albums of the 1980s.

Pretenders has been named one of the best albums of all time by VH1 (#52). In 2003, Rolling Stone ranked the album at number 155 on its list of the 500 greatest albums of all time, with Pretenders maintaining the rating in the 2012 revised list, and moving up to number 152 on the 2020 revision. In 2020, Rolling Stone included the band's debut album in their "80 Greatest albums of 1980" list.

Ultimate Classic Rock critic Bryan Wawzenek rated "Precious", "Kid", "Tattooed Love Boys" and "Brass in Pocket" as being among drummer Martin Chambers' top 10 Pretenders songs.

Track listing

Song notes
"This is one of the most astonishing debut albums in the history of music," enthused author Michael Chabon. "On songs like 'Tattooed Love Boys', you're wondering, Who is Chrissie singing about when she says, 'I shot my mouth off and you showed me what that hole was for?' That was just one of those obsessive-listening records for me." In her autobiography, Hynde confirms she is singing about herself and her own personal experience.
"Tattooed Love Boys" is a playable track in the PlayStation 2 and Xbox 360 video game Guitar Hero II. Its guitar solo is a homage to James Honeyman-Scott's heroes. "I liked the guitar solo in 'Tattooed Love Boys'," Hynde recalled. "I love Jimmy Scott's playing."
"Space Invader" is an instrumental containing sound effects from the 1978 arcade game Space Invaders. It also appeared in the film Cheech and Chong's Next Movie and the television series Miami Vice and The Sopranos.
Game developer Dona Bailey cited the song as her introduction to video games, stating it inspired her to play the original arcade game Space Invaders and then join Atari, where she developed the 1980 arcade game Centipede.
"Private Life" is featured in Grand Theft Auto: Vice City Stories on fictional radio station Emotion 98.3. It was covered by Grace Jones, on her album Warm Leatherette.
"Mystery Achievement" is featured in the closing montage in the final episode of the second season of the HBO show The Deuce, season 2, episode 9, "Inside the Pretend".

Personnel
The Pretenders
Chrissie Hynde – lead vocals, rhythm guitars, backing vocals (except CD1, track 5)
Martin Chambers – drums, percussion, backing vocals
Pete Farndon – bass guitar, backing vocals
James Honeyman-Scott – lead and rhythm guitars, keyboards, backing vocals

Additional musicians
Fred Berk – bass guitar on CD2, track 3
Geoff Bryant – French horn
Nick Lowe – production on CD1, track 7
Henry Lowther – trumpet
Gerry Mackelduff – drums on CD1, track 7 and CD2, tracks 4, 5, 7, 9, 10
Chris Mercer – saxophone
Nigel Pegrum – drums on CD2, track 3
Chris Thomas – keyboards, sound effects, production
Jim Wilson – trumpet

Technical
Bill Price – engineer
Kevin Hughes – design
Chalkie Davies – front cover photography

Charts

Weekly charts

Year-end charts

Certifications

References

The Pretenders albums
1979 debut albums
Albums produced by Chris Thomas (record producer)
Albums produced by Nick Lowe
Sire Records albums